Little England may refer to:

Places
Little England (Gloucester, Virginia), an historic plantation house in the U.S.
Little England beyond Wales, southwest Wales
Historic Little England, formerly Victoria Boulevard Historic District, Hampton, Virginia, U.S.
Barbados, see Geography of Barbados
Thally, Tamilnadu, India
Mirpur, Azad Kashmir, Pakistan
Nuwara Eliya, Central Province, Sri Lanka

Other
A term for a non-imperial England or United Kingdom as advocated by the Little Englander movement
Little England (film), a 2013 Greek film
Little England (TV series), a British documentary show
A realm in "The Great Game", a volume of the comic book Die

See also
Little Britain (disambiguation)